Drammen is a city and municipality in Viken, Norway. The port and river city of Drammen is centrally located in the south-eastern and most populated part of Norway. Drammen municipality also includes smaller towns and villages such as Konnerud, Svelvik, Mjøndalen and Skoger.

Location
Drammen is located west of the Oslofjord and is situated approximately 44 km South-west of Oslo. There are more than 101 000 inhabitants in the municipality, but the city is the regional capital of an area with 82 000 inhabitants. Drammen and the surrounding communities are growing more than ever before. The city makes good use of the river and inland waterway called Drammensfjord, both for recreation, activities and housing.

Name and coat of arms
The Old Norse form of the city's name was Drafn, and this was originally the name of the inner part of Drammensfjord. The fjord is, however, probably named after the river Drammenselva (Norse Drǫfn), and this again is derived from drǫfn f 'wave'.
The coat-of-arms is from modern times.  They were granted on 17 November 1960.  The arms has a silver-colored column on top a silver-colored bedrock crossed with a silver-colored key and sword against a blue background.  It is based upon the old seal dating from 1723 for Bragernes, one of the central parts of Drammen. The motto for Bragernes (in Latin) was In Fide Et Justitia Fortitudo, and the items in the seal are referring to this: key = faith, sword = justice, column on rocks = strength.

Governance 
On January 1, 2020, the municipalities of Svelvik, Nedre Eiker and Drammen merged to form «The New Drammen Municipality». The new municipality, which is now called Drammen, is located in Viken County and is Norway's seventh largest with over 100,000 residents. The main seat of the Greater Municipality is located in the city of Drammen.
Drammen city had a population of 82.875 inhabitants in 2021, but serves as a regional centre for an area that had a population of 110.236 inhabitants in 2021. The city is the country's record champion in environment and urban development, 21 prices since 2003 with 16 national and 5 international.

Districts
After the merger of the municipalities Drammen, Nedre Eiker and Svelvik in 2020, the municipality was then divided into ten municipal regions:

History

Rock carvings at Åskollen and Austad are 6000 to 7000 years old, and are the first signs of human activity in the area. The largest rock carving at Åskollen depicts a moose.

Drammen originally consisted of three small seaports: Bragernes (on the northern side of the Drammenselva river) and Strømsø and Tangen (both on the southern side of the river). For trade purposes, small seaports were placed under market towns. Despite their geographical proximity, Bragernes was placed under Christiania and Strømsø under Tønsberg. For this reason, cooperation between the adjacent seaport towns was almost impossible.

In 1662, a merger was proposed to unite Strømsø and Bragernes to form a market town with the name Frederiksstrøm. The proposal was rejected by Frederick III of Denmark. Bragernes received limited market town rights in 1715, and merged with Strømsø to gain status as a single city on 19 June 1811.

Its geographical location made the city favorable for seafaring, shipbuilding, log driving, timber trade. During the 19th century, paper and pulp industries were developed.  Large parts of the city were ruined in the great fire of 12–13 July 1866, which led to the reconstruction of the city centre, including the characteristic town square and Bragernes church. The Drammen Line (Drammenbanen ) opened in 1872 providing rail service between Drammen and Oslo.

In 1909, Drammen got the first trolleybus system in Scandinavia, the Drammen trolleybus. The lines ran until 1967. For many years the centre of Drammen suffered from heavy traffic. In 1970, Drammen Bridge with two lanes on European route E18 was built (expanded to four lanes in 2006) and in 1999 the opening of the Bragernes tunnel (Bragernestunnelen) diverted additional traffic away from the centre of the city.

In recent years, the city centre has seen the introduction of new housing, shopping facilities, restaurants, cafes and bars, as well as a public pathway along the Drammenselva river.

In 2011, Drammen observed its 200th anniversary with many citywide jubilee celebrations. Drammen's district heating system was upgraded to use water-sourced heat pumps, drawing on local fjord water, to support population growth in the city.

Geography
The city centre lies at the end of a valley, on both sides of the Drammenselva river, and where the river meets the Drammensfjord. The Holmen island in Drammen is also the main harbor for car and fruit import in Norway.

The Drammen region is part of the metropolitan region around Oslo and the country's fifth largest urban area, it extends far beyond the municipal boundaries; into the municipalities of Lier, Asker, Øvre Eiker and Holmestrand. The total population of the settlement is 110,236 inhabitants as of 1 January 2021.

In 2008 Drammen won the prestigious prize for the best city development in Europe.

Climate
Drammen has a humid continental climate (Dfb). Located at a sheltered location at the head of a narrow fjord branch of innermost Oslofjord, Drammen is among the warmest cities in Scandinavia in summer. The warmest month on record was July 2018 with mean , average daily high  and 11 days with highs at or above . The all-time high  was recorded August 3, 1982, and is a tie with the national high for the month. The September record high is the national record. The all-time low  was recorded in January 1987, which is the coldest month on record with mean  and average daily low . In more recent years, December 2010 was almost as cold. The average date for first overnight freeze (low below ) in autumn is 13 October (1981-2010 average). The Drammen-Berskog weather station has been operating since 2004. An earlier weather station named Drammen-Marienlyst (3 m) operated from 1966 to 2003.

Demographics
Percentage Immigrants and Norwegian-born with immigrant parents in Drammen is 28 per cent, of which 25 per cent are Norwegian-born with immigrant parents.

Attractions

Aass Brewery

Aass Brewery is the oldest surviving brewery in Norway, and has won acclaim for both its beer and its well-conserved building. Founded in 1834, the brewery's primary products are soft drinks, beer and aquavit.

Bridges
Øvre Sund Bridge (Øvre Sund bru) – crosses Drammenselva in the center of Drammen
Drammen City Bridge (Drammensbrua bybro) – was a concrete bridge connecting the two centers of the city, built in 1936 and demolished in 2022. A new city bridge will open in the autumn of 2025 on the same site.
 Drammen Bridge (Drammensbrua) – motorway box girder bridge on E18 that crosses Drammenselva, built 1971
 Ypsilon Bridge (Ypsilon bru) – cable-stayed pedestrian bridge over Drammenselva, built 2007
Holmen bridges (Holmenbruene) – two railway bridges on the Drammen Line
Nedre Eiker Bridge – (Nedre Eiker bru) crosses Drammenselva up the river connecting the towns Krokstadelva og Mjøndalen.
Mjøndalsbrua – The old bridge between Mjøndalen and Krokstadelva, built for crossing of horse-drawn carriages in 1910.

Drammen Museum

The Drammen Museum of Art and Cultural History includes Marienlyst, a manor house from ca. 1770, museum building from 1930 with the museum's administration, permanent exhibitions and collections, and Lyche pavilion from 1990 with the gallery, temporary exhibitions and museum café, Halling yard, with 5 old buildings, the oldest from 1760s. The museum also includes the two largest preserved like farms in Drammen, Gulskogen Manor and Austad farm.

Drammen Spiral
It opened in 1961 on the site of a former quarry.

Drammen Theater
Drammen Theater in Bragernes was built in 1869 and was designed by architect Emil Victor Langlet. The theater was the first modern theater in the country. It was designed in a complex Renaissance style with symmetrical facades and round arched windows. After Drammen Theater suffered total destruction by fire in December 1993, a new theater was rebuilt on the model of the original house. It was finished during February 1997.

Drammensbadet
Drammensbadet is a public swimming and training facility located in Marienlyst, Drammen. It was one of the largest in Norway when it opened 1 September 2008. They have five indoor and four outdoor pools.

Bragernes Torg (town square)
Bragernes Torg is the largest town square in Norway and one of the largest in the Nordics.

Sport clubs

 Strømsgodset IF and their elite football section Strømsgodset Toppfotball. Founded 10 February 1907. Five Norwegian Cups in football (1969, 1970, 1973, 1991, 2010). Winner of the Norwegian football league in 1970 and 2013. Won six Norwegian championships in bandy.
 Drammen golfklubb. Founded in 1988. Golf club with 18-hole course situated in the southern part of Drammen, on the border to Sande in Vestfold.
 Drammen HK Handball club competing in Men's European Champions League (07/08)
 IF Hellas
 IF Sturla
 Konnerud IL Sport club most famous for its cross-country skiing facilities.
 SBK Drafn Founded 15 September 1910, 21 Norwegian Championships in bandy, 1 lost cup final in football (1927). One World Champion ski jumper, Hans Bjørnstad 1950. Ole Olympic Gold medallist, Thorleif Haug 1924 (three gold, one bronze).
 SBK Skiold
Drammen Bandy plays in the highest division.
 Drammen FK. Founded 23 August 2008.

Notable residents

Public service & business 

 Niels Treschow (1751 in Strømsø – 1833) a philosopher, educator and politician
 Jørgen Herman Vogt (1784 in Bragernes – 1862) First Minister of Norway, 1856 to 1858
 Christen Smith (1785 in Skoger – 1816 at Congo River) physician, economist and botanist
 Erik Børresen (1785 in Bragernes – 1860) owned the first Norwegian ships to sail to China
 Bent Salvesen (1787-1820) a ship's captain and privateer; sailed from Drammen
 Bernhard Pauss (born 1839 at Tangen - 1907) theologian, educator, author and humanitarian
 Gustav Jensen (1845 in Drammen – 1922) priest, hymnwriter, seminary instructor and liturgist
 Anthon B. Nilsen (1855 in Svelvik – 1936) businessman, politician and author
 Urban Jacob Rasmus Børresen (1857 in Drammen – 1943) a rear admiral and industrialist
 Betzy Kjelsberg (1866 in Svelvik – 1950) politician, women's rights activist and suffragist
 Johan Aschehoug Kiær (1869 in Drammen – 1931) a paleontologist and geologist
 Johan Berger Mathiesen (born 1872 in Drammen - 1923) surgeon, worked in Eau Claire, WI 
 Arnold Maria Hansson (born 1889 in Drammen - 1981) New Zealand forestry administrator and consultant
 Konrad Knudsen (1890 in Drammen - 1959) painter and journalist, host to Leon Trotsky 1935/6
 Henning Bødtker (1891 in Svelvik – 1975) lawyer, Attorney General of Norway, 1945 to 1962
 Odd Dahl (1898 in Drammen – 1994) engineer, nuclear physics researcher and explorer
 Arnfinn Vik (1901 in Drammen – 1990) politician. Mayor of Oslo, 1945 to 1947
 Henry Wilhelm Kristiansen (1902 in Drammen – 1942) politician, chairman of the Communist Party of Norway 1931-1934
 Asbjørn Bryhn (1906 in Drammen – 1990) head of the Norwegian Police Security Service
 Thorstein Treholt (1911 in Skoger – 1993) politician and father of convicted spy Arne Treholt
 Lars Korvald (1916 in Mjøndalen – 2006) politician, Prime Minister of Norway 1972 to 1973
 Astrid Bjellebø Bayegan (born 1943) first female dean in Norway, at Drammen since 1989
 Svein Rennemo (born 1947 in Drammen) a businessperson and chair of Statoil
 Thorbjørn Jagland (born 1950 in Drammen) Prime Minister of Norway, 1996 to 1997
 Per-Erik Burud (1962 in Drammen – 2011) Norwegian billionaire, head of grocery chain Kiwi

The Arts 

 Hanna Winsnes (1789 in Bragernes – 1872) a poet, novelist and cookbook writer
 Martinus Rørbye (1803 in Drammen – 1848) a Danish Golden Age painter, worked in Skagen
 Peter Nicolai Arbo (1831 in Drammen – 1892) painter of history motifs and Norse mythology
 Christian Cappelen (1845 in Drammen – 1916) a Norwegian organist and composer
 Hans Heyerdahl (1857-1913) realist painter, portraits and landscapes; grew up in Drammen
 Johan Halvorsen (1864 in Drammen – 1935) a Norwegian composer, conductor and violinist
 Barbra Ring (1870 in Drammen – 1955) novelist, short story writer and theatre critic
 Herman Wildenvey (1885 at Mjøndalen – 1959) a distinguished Norwegian poet 
 Lalla Carlsen (1889 in Svelvik – 1967) a Norwegian singer and actress
 Kai Fjell (1907 in Skoger - 1989) painter, printmaker and scenographer
 Jens Gunderssen (1912 in Drammen – 1969) singer, songwriter, actor and theatre director
 Eivind Lund (1914 in Drammen - 1984) a Norwegian painter
 Solveig Christov (1918 in Drammen – 1984) writer of short stories, novels and plays
 Sverre Holm (1931 in Drammen – 2005) a Norwegian stage and film actor
 Triztán Vindtorn (1942 in Drammen – 2009) a poet and performance artist
 Lars Klevstrand (born 1949 in Drammen) a singer, guitarist, composer and actor
 Herodes Falsk (born 1954 in Drammen) comedian, actor, author, and songwriter
 Katharina Nuttall (born 1972 in Drammen) an artist, film composer and music producer
 Todd Terje (born 1981 in Mjøndalen) a Norwegian DJ, songwriter, and record producer

Sport 

 Thorleif Haug (1894 in Lier – 1934) three Nordic skiing gold medals at 1924 Winter Olympics
 Charles Mathiesen (1911 in Drammen – 1994) speed skater gold medal 1936 Winter Olympics
 Johan Haanes (1912 in Drammen – 2000) tennis player, ski jumper and track and field athlete
 Finn Helgesen (1919 in Drammen – 2011) speed skater, gold medalist 1948 Winter Olympics
 Arne Bergodd (born 1948 in Drammen) rower, team silver medallist at 1976 Summer Olympics
 Arne Dokken (born 1955 in Drammen) footballer with 190 club caps and 24 for Norway
 Svend Karlsen (born 1967 in Drammen) former strongman, powerlifter and bodybuilder
 Johann Olav Koss (born 1968 in Drammen) speed skater with four Olympic gold medals
 Glenn Solberg (born 1972 in Drammen) handball coach, former player, 122 caps for Norway
 Heidi Tjugum (born 1973 in Drammen) team handballer, twice Olympic team medallist
 Ole Einar Bjørndalen (born 1974 in Drammen) retired biathlete, 13 Winter Olympics medals
 Adnan Haidar (born 1989 in Drammen) footballer with over 150 club caps and 36 for Lebanon 
 Martin Ødegaard (born 1998) footballer with 200+ club caps, captain of Norway with 25 caps and the captain of Arsenal 
Kristian Krogh Johannessen (born 1995) Professional golfer, qualified to represent Norway at the 2021 Olympics.
 Hakon Lagerqvist (1970 in Drammen – Present) Local skier. First documented ski descent of the Kjøsterudjuvet and skied 10000 vertical meters in one day at Norefjell ski area.

Twin towns – sister cities

Drammen is twinned with:
 Kolding, Denmark
 Lappeenranta, Finland
 Örebro, Sweden
 Stykkishólmur, Iceland

Gallery - Churches & Tunnels

References

Bibliography
  
 Attribution to Tingle given in

External links

 
 Tourist Information
 Elvebyen Drammen 
 River City of Drammen
 Visit Drammen
 Drammen kommune

 
Municipalities of Buskerud
Municipalities of Viken (county)
Cities and towns in Norway
Populated coastal places in Norway